The FAI World Aerobatic Championships (WAC) is a competition in sport aviation organized by CIVA (Commission Internationale de Voltige Arienne), the aerobatic commission of the Fédération Aéronautique Internationale, the world air sports federation.

The WAC was formed in 1960, replacing the freestyle Lockheed Trophy contests.

Winners Aresti Cup

Winners by teams

See also 
 FAI European Aerobatic Championships
 Aerobatic maneuver
 Competition aerobatics
 Aerobatic aircraft

References
Notes

Bibliography
 http://www.wac2011.it/
 www.fai.org/civa-events/civa-events-calendar-and-results#
 http://www.german-aerobatics.com

Aerobatic competitions
Aerobatics
Aerobatic